Bagan Datuk (formerly spelled Bagan Datoh), is a town and mukim in Bagan Datuk District, Perak, Malaysia.

Location 
Bagan Datuk is the most southwest district in the state of Perak. It is about 130 km (by car) from the state capital Ipoh and 46 km from Teluk Intan. Across the Bernam River is Sabak, Selangor.

Economy
The main economic activity in Bagan Datuk is fishing. There are also, however, many coconut plantations nearby, visible along the road to Bagan Datuk from Teluk Intan.

There are also a few fishing villages scattered around Bagan Datuk, for example Sungai Tiang and Sungai Burong, and their corresponding seaside village Bagan Sungai Tiang and Bagan Sungai Burong. On the way from Teluk Intan there will be a few small township which are Hutan Melintang, Selekoh and Simpang Tiga. One popular spot for angling is Sungai Dulang, situated about 8 km from Bagan Datuk. It is famous for lobster fishing where an angler's night spent there could harvest up to 5 kilograms of lobsters.

Transportation
Highway 69 is the main ingress to Bagan Datuk town. KTM Intercity does not serve the area.

Politics
Bagan Datuk is represented in the Dewan Rakyat of the Malaysian Parliament by Deputy Prime Minister Dato' Seri Ahmad Zahid Hamidi from UMNO.

On the state level, Bagan Datuk provides two seats to the Perak State Legislative Assembly:
 Rungkup
 Hutan Melintang

Rungkup is currently held by Shahrul Zaman bin Yahya while Hutan Melintang is currently held by Khairuddin bin Tarmizi. Both politicians are from UMNO.

References

External links 

JPN Bagan Datoh

Bagan Datuk District
Towns in Perak
Mukims of Perak